Backyard Dogs is a 2000 sports film written and directed by Robert Boris.

Plot

Two best friends with dreams of becoming professional wrestlers start wrestling in underground backyard events.

Cast

References

External links 
 
 

2000 films
2000s English-language films
Films scored by Billy White Acre
Films directed by Robert Boris
Professional wrestling films
2000s sports comedy films
American independent films
2000 independent films
2000 comedy films
2000s American films